Rebels Never Die (stylized in all caps) is the second studio album by Dutch DJ and record producer Hardwell. It was released on 9 September 2022 by his own record label, Revealed Recordings.

History 
On 7 September 2018, Hardwell had announced his indefinite hiatus from touring, stating that he wanted to focus more on his personal life. On March 27, 2022, he made his return to the dance scene by closing out the Ultra Miami 2022 festival as the rumored special guest. During his set, he played 13 IDs that introduced his new bigroom-techno style and would be released as part of his upcoming album. Additionally, he played a 10-year anniversary remix of his song "Spaceman".

On 1 April, Hardwell released the first two singles from the album, "Broken Mirror" and "Into the Unknown". "Broken Mirror" features a monologue from Hardwell, saying "...your opinion of me does not define who I am. Cause I know what you want me to be. Now, I'm gonna show you who I truly am." "Into the Unknown" was the first of the singles to introduce the bigroom-techno style of his album.

Hardwell released the IDs as singles from the album every two weeks. However, on 15 July, he released "Zero Gravity" a week after the album's previous single to generate excitement for his four-year return to Tomorrowland.

On 9 September, he released the Rebels Never Die album, featuring the last unreleased ID from his set, the titular song. Rebels Never Die appeared in Dancing Astronaut's Top Dance Albums of 2022.

On 23 December, the deluxe version of Rebels Never Die was released. It features a new original, "Oh Gosh", three reworks of previous Hardwell songs, and a mashup of "F*cking Society" and Metallica's "Nothing Else Matters".

Album description 
Hardwell used his hiatus as an opportunity to explore creative freedom. He was inspired to create Rebels Never Die from a vinyl collection he listened to in his childhood.

The bigroom-techno sound of Rebels Never Die has been described as "future techno" and "future rave". It is a bold switch-up from Hardwell's euphoric big room house style, replacing anthemic vocals with cerebral, spine-chilling samples.

Hardwell described the style of his album with:

Track listing 
All tracks are stylized in all caps.

Charts

References 

Hardwell albums
2022 albums
Electronic dance music albums